In enzymology, an adenylyl-[glutamate---ammonia ligase] hydrolase is an enzyme that catalyzes the chemical reaction

adenylyl-[L-glutamate:ammonia ligase (ADP-forming)] + H2O  adenylate + [L-glutamate:ammonia ligase (ADP-forming)]

Thus, the two substrates of this enzyme are [[adenylyl-[L-glutamate:ammonia ligase (ADP-forming)]]] and H2O, whereas its two products are adenylate and L-glutamate:ammonia ligase (ADP-forming).

This enzyme belongs to the family of hydrolases, specifically those acting on phosphoric diester bonds.  The systematic name of this enzyme class is adenylyl-[L-glutamate:ammonia ligase (ADP-forming)] adenylylhydrolase. Other names in common use include adenylyl-[glutamine-synthetase]hydrolase, and adenylyl(glutamine synthetase) hydrolase.

References

 
 
 

EC 3.1.4
Enzymes of unknown structure